Leo Brereton (1 November 1936 – 12 October 2020) was an Australian rules footballer in the Victorian Football League.

Career
Brereton made his debut for the Carlton Football Club in the Round 1 of the 1957 season. He left the club at the end of the 1962 season.
In 1964 he was recruited to the Manuka Football Club, part of the Canberra Australian National Football League, and played there for two years.

References

External links
 Leo Brereton at Blueseum
 
 

1936 births
2020 deaths
Carlton Football Club players
Australian rules footballers from Victoria (Australia)